Margaret Widdemer (September 30, 1884 – July 14, 1978) was an American poet and novelist. She won the Pulitzer Prize (known then as the Columbia University Prize) in 1919 for her collection The Old Road to Paradise, shared with Carl Sandburg for Cornhuskers.

Biography
Margaret Widdemer was born in Doylestown, Pennsylvania, and grew up in Asbury Park, New Jersey, where her father, Howard T. Widdemer, was a minister of the First Congregational Church. She graduated from the Drexel Institute Library School in 1909. She first came to public attention with her poem The Factories, which treated the subject of child labor. In 1919, she married Robert Haven Schauffler (1879–1964), a widower five years her senior. Schauffler was an author and cellist who published widely on poetry, travel, culture, and music. His papers are held at the University of Texas at Austin.

Widdemer's memoir Golden Years I Had recounts her friendships with eminent authors such as Ezra Pound, F. Scott Fitzgerald, T. S. Eliot, Thornton Wilder, and Edna St. Vincent Millay.

The scholar Joan Shelley Rubin has surmised that Widdemer coined the term "middlebrow" in her essay "Message and Middlebrow," published in 1933 in The Saturday Review of Literature. However, the term had previously been used by the British magazine Punch in 1925.

Widdemer died in New York City, in 1978.

Works

Poetry collections
The Factories, With Other Lyrics (1915)
The Old Road to Paradise (1918)
Cross Currents (1921)
Little Girl and Boy Land (1924)
Ballads and Lyrics (1925)
Collected Poems (1928)
The Road to Downderry (1931)
Hill Garden (1937)
Dark Cavalier (1958)

Children's fiction
Winona of the Camp Fire (1915)
Winona of Camp Karonya (1917)
You're Only Young Once (1918)
Winona's War Farm (1918)
Winona's Way (1919)
Winona on her Own (1922)
Winona's Dreams Come True (1923)
Binkie and the Bell Dolls (1923)
Marcia's Farmhouse (1939)

On writing
Do You Want to Write? (1937)
Basic Principles of Fiction Writing (1953)

Memoir
Golden Friends I Had (1964)
Summers at the Colony (1964)
Jessie Rittenhouse: A Centenary Memoir-Anthology (1969)

Adult fiction
The Rose-Garden Husband (1915) – adapted as the 1917 film A Wife on Trial
Why Not? (1916) – adapted as the 1918 film The Dream Lady
The Wishing Ring Man (1919) – adapted as the film The Wishing Ring Man
The Boardwalk (1919)
I’ve Married Marjorie (1920)
The Boardwalk (1920)
The Year of Delight (1921)
A Minister of Grace (1922)
Graven Image (1923)
Charis Sees It Through (1924)
Gallant Lady (1926)
More Than Wife (1927)
Loyal Lover (1929)
Rhinestones (1929)
All the King's Horses (1930)
The Truth About Lovers (1931)
The Pre-War Lady (1932)
The Years of Love (1933)
Golden Rain (1933)
The Other Lovers (1934)
Eve's Orchard (1935)
Back to Virtue, Betty (1935)
Songs for a Christmas Tree (1935)
This Isn't the End (1936)
The Singing Wood (1936)Marriage is Possible (1936)Ladies Go Masked (1939)Hand on Her Shoulder (1939)She Knew Three Brothers (1939)Someday I'll Find You (1940)Lover's Alibi (1941)Angela Comes Home (1942)Constancia Herself (1945)Let Me Have Wings (1945)Lani (1949)Red Cloak Flying (1950)Lady of the Mohawks (1951)The Great Pine's Son (1954)The Golden Wildcat (1957)Buckskin Baronet (1960)The Red Castle Women'' (1968)

See also

Notes

References

External links

 A Celebration of Women Writers: The Old Road to Paradise by Margaret Widdemer
 
 
 
 

1884 births
1978 deaths
20th-century American novelists
American children's writers
20th-century American poets
Pulitzer Prize for Poetry winners
American women novelists
American women poets
American women children's writers
20th-century American women writers